Udayagiri ('Udaya' meaning morning and 'giri' meaning peak, Udayagiri translates as the peak on which morning sunlight falls first) is the name of many places in India, among them:
Udayagiri, Nellore district, a village famous for the hills and ancient buildings in Andhra Pradesh
Udayagiri Mandal, a mandal (administrative subdivision) in Andhra Pradesh headquartered at Udayagiri
Udayagiri (Assembly constituency), a constituency of Andhra Pradesh Legislative Assembly
Udayagiri, Mysore, a neighborhood in Mysore, Karnataka
Udayagiri, Kannur, a village in Thaliparamba taluk of Kannur District in Kerala.
Udayagiri, Odisha, Buddhist complex in Odisha composed of major stupas and viharas.
Udayagiri and Khandagiri Caves, the site of ruins of a complex of buildings near Bhubaneswar
Udayagiri Fort, one in Tamil Nadu and the other in Andhra Pradesh
Udaygiri Caves, caves near Vidisha in Madhya Pradesh
 G. Udayagiri, a town in Odisha
Udayagiri Raja Maha Vihara, an ancient Buddhist temple in Sri Lanka

See also
Udayagiri caves (disambiguation)